Jewels of the Sea is a 1961 orchestral exotica album by American composer Les Baxter. The album was inspired by fantasy ideas of the ocean from pop culture, such as mermaids and sea nymphs, sunken ships, and legendary underwater cities such as Atlantis. There was an overall erotic element to the album, whose tagline was "Titillating Orchestrations for Listening and Loving", and whose original cover featured actress and model Diane Webber smiling glamorously underwater, apparently naked. Although not explicitly shown wearing a mermaid tail, her makeup and jewellery are styled to be reminiscent of the performing mermaids at Weeki Wachee Springs.

Musically, Jewels of the Sea is characteristic of Baxter's work, with its use of a traditional European orchestra, primarily percussion instruments and strings, combined with more exotic instruments such as electronic keyboard and electric organ. All tracks are original compositions with the exception of "The Enchanted Sea", an arrangement of Claude Debussy's La mer. The mood of the album ranges from upbeat to melancholy, with an overall relaxing effect.

The album was generally well-received by critics. Electronics World called the oceanic theme "pure corn", but the music "first rate." Frank Arganbright of the Journal & Courier called it "sparkling to say the least." Merrill McCord of The Courier-Journal called it a "concert-like spectacular." The Virgin Encyclopedia of Fifties Music rated it three stars out of four.

Track list 
Adapted from the liner notes of the CD reissue of Jewels of the Sea, track lengths from iTunes. All tracks composed, arranged, and conducted by Les Baxter unless noted. The original vinyl recording consisted of twelve tracks. When the album was reissued on audio CD in 2012 by él, fifteen bonus tracks drawn from three other Baxter albums were added as bonus material.

References 

1961 albums
Les Baxter albums
Exotica albums
Capitol Records albums
Mermaids in popular culture